The sombre tit (Poecile lugubris) is a member of the tit family found in southeast Europe and southwest Asia.
Sombre tits occur in low density in thin woodlands at the elevation range between 1000 and 1600 metres above sea level. Similar to the other tit species, the sombre tit is a cavity-nesting species, which makes the nests in the holes in juniper, willow, poplar, and other relevant tree species. In some cases they nest in iron pipes (e.g. the ones used for orchard fencing), and in artificial nest-boxes. The clutch usually consists on 4 to 9 eggs, having two clutches per year. The species appear to be resident in the country with slight local movements. They breed on mountain slopes and in open deciduous forest; lower down on in trees and bushes in rocky terrain, as well as in fruit orchards. The breeding season lasts from early April till end of July - beginning of August. The food mainly consists on insects.

Molecular phylogenetic studies have shown that the sombre tit is sister to the white-browed tit (Poecile superciliosus).

References

sombre tit
Birds of Europe
Birds of Azerbaijan
Birds of Western Asia
sombre tit